George Stokes may refer to:

 Sir George Stokes, 1st Baronet (George Gabriel Stokes, 1819–1903), Irish mathematician and physicist
 List of things named after George Gabriel Stokes
 Sir George Stokes Award (colloquially the Stokes Medal), awarded by the Analytical Division of the Royal Society of Chemistry, biennially
 George Henry Stokes (1876–1959), Member of Canadian Parliament
 George Thomas Stokes (1843–1898), Irish historian
 George Stokes (rugby union) (born 1995), Scottish rugby union player